George Rozgonyi (died in 1457 or 1458) was an influential lord in the Kingdom of Hungary in the 15th century. He was judge royal from 1441 to 1445 and one of the seven "captains in chief" between 1445 and 1446.

References

Sources 

1450s deaths
Judges royal
George